Jarmo Hyttinen is a Finnish film actor and screenwriter.
 
Hyttinen began his career in acting in 1993 with one appearance on TV but it wasn't until five years later he appeared in film in 1998 with little or no work in between. Since then he has mostly appeared in Finnish film and has also written a number of TV series and film scripts  since 2002. He starred in the 2005 film Paha maa and more recently in the 2006 film Saippuaprinssi  in which he worked with actors such as Mikko Leppilampi, Pamela Tola and Teijo Eloranta.

Filmography

External links
 

1956 births
Living people
Film people from Helsinki
Finnish male film actors
Finnish screenwriters
Finnish television writers
Male television writers